Mohammed ben Abdallah (born 25 April 1944) is a Ghanaian playwright, "the major Ghanaian playwright of his generation". Director and founder of the Legon Road Theatre, he became head of School of Performing Arts at the University of Ghana in 2003. His works portray postcolonial drama that integrates both indigenous and European themes relevant in contemporary African societies. Written in 1972, ben Abdullah's first book, The Slaves, became the foremost non-American dramatic play to win the Randolph Edmund's Award of the National Association for Speech and Dramatic Arts. Ben Abdallah held cabinet positions during the Military government of the Provisional National Defence Council.

See also
Ghanaian writers

References

Ghanaian dramatists and playwrights
1944 births
Living people
People from Kumasi